The 2011–12 Long Island Blackbirds men's basketball team represented The Brooklyn Campus of Long Island University during the 2011–12 NCAA Division I men's basketball season. The Blackbirds, led by tenth year head coach Jim Ferry, played their home games at the Athletic, Recreation & Wellness Center and are members of the Northeast Conference. They finished the season 25–9, 16–2 in NEC play to be crowned regular season champions. They also were champions of the Northeast Conference Basketball tournament to earn the conference's automatic bid into the 2012 NCAA tournament where they lost in the second round to Michigan State.

Roster

Schedule

|-
!colspan=9 style=| Exhibition

|-
!colspan=9 style=| Regular season

|-
!colspan=9 style=| NEC tournament

|-
!colspan=9 style=| NCAA tournament

References

LIU Brooklyn Blackbirds men's basketball seasons
Long Island
Long Island
Long
Long